The Royal Air Force (RAF) operates several stations throughout the United Kingdom and overseas. This includes front-line and training air bases, support, administrative and training stations with no flying activity, unmanned airfields used for training, intelligence gathering stations and an early warning radar network. 

The list also includes RAF stations operated by the United States Visiting Forces, former RAF stations now operated by defence contractor QinetiQ on behalf the Ministry of Defence (MOD) and air weapons ranges operated by the MOD.

Overseas, the RAF operates airfields at four Permanent Joint Operating Bases (PJOBs) which are located in British Overseas Territories.

RAF stations and MOD airfields in the UK

Royal Air Force

RAF front-line operations are centred on seven main operating bases (MOBs):
 RAF Coningsby, RAF Marham and RAF Lossiemouth (Air Combat)
 RAF Waddington (Combat Intelligence, Surveillance Target Acquisition and Reconnaissance)
 RAF Brize Norton (Air Transport)
 RAF Benson and RAF Odiham (Support Helicopter Force, operating under Joint Helicopter Command)

Operations are supported by numerous other flying and non-flying stations, with activity centred at RAF Honington which coordinates Force Protection, and RAF Leeming and RAF Wittering which have a support enabler role.

Stations such as RAF College Cranwell, RAF Valley and RAF Shawbury form part of the UK Military Flying Training System, which is dedicated to training aircrew for all three UK armed services. Specialist ground crew training takes place at RAF Cosford and MOD St Athan.

The Control and Reporting Centre (CRC) at RAF Boulmer is tasked with compiling a Recognised Air Picture of UK airspace and providing tactical control of the Quick Reaction Alert Force. Boulmer is supported by a network of eight Remote Radar Heads (RRHs) spread the length of the UK.

Ministry of Defence 
Several former RAF stations are still owned by the Ministry of Defence (MOD) and are operated by defence contractor QinetiQ in the test and evaluation role. The main facility is MOD Boscombe Down, which still has a significant RAF presence.

A small number of former RAF stations remain in MOD ownership even though they are used by the RAF in the relief landing ground (RLG) role, flying by Volunteer Gliding Squadrons or other training purposes. They are described as airfields and are typically unmanned.

List of sites 
British Army facilities at Aldergrove and Leuchars are listed in recognition of the RAF retaining an operational airfield at each site.

RAF stations operated by the United States Visiting Forces
At the invitation of the UK Government, the United States has had military forces (known as US Visiting Forces) permanently stationed in the UK since the Second World War. The 1951 NATO Status of Forces Agreement and the Visiting Forces Act 1952, along with other bilateral acts, establishes the legal status of the USVF in the UK. Several military sites within England are made available for the USVF's purposes.

An RAF commander is present at the main USVF sites and is normally of the rank of Squadron Leader, whereas a US Colonel will normally command US personnel at each station. The role of the RAF commander is to liaise with the US base commander and act as head of establishment for Ministry of Defence employees. The use of UK bases for combat operations by the United States is a joint decision by both governments.

The United States Air Force (USAF) 501st Combat Support Wing manages and supports operations at RAF Alconbury, RAF Croughton, RAF Fairford, RAF Menwith Hill, RAF Molesworth and RAF Welford, whereas RAF Lakenheath and RAF Mildenhall are managed by their respective host wings.

MOD air weapons ranges 
Air weapons ranges (AWR) within the UK, previously operated by the RAF, are the responsibility of the Service Delivery (SD) part of the Defence Infrastructure Organisation (DIO). QinetiQ were awarded a three-year contract by the DIO in 2010 to manage the ranges but this role was taken over by Landmarc Support Services (part of Interserve) in 2014 as part of a contract covering the wider MOD Defence Training Estate.

RAF stations and locations overseas

Permanent Joint Operating Bases 
The UK operates Permanent Joint Operating Bases (PJOBs) in the four British Overseas Territories of Ascension Island; the Sovereign Base Areas of Akrotiri and Dhekelia in Cyprus; the Falkland Islands; and Gibraltar. The PJOBs contribute to the physical defence and maintenance of sovereignty of the British Overseas Territories and enable the UK to conduct expeditionary military operations. Although the Director of Overseas Bases, Strategic Command, controls and oversees the PJOBs.

Semi-permanent operations 
The RAF have a semi-permanent presence at several overseas locations. Active military operations in the Middle East are supported by Expeditionary Air Wings which have been established at foreign airfields in the United Arab Emirates and Qatar. The RAF have a presence within Eastern European countries on a rotational basis as part of the NATO's Baltic Air Policing and Southern Air Policing missions.

No. 17 Test and Evaluation Squadron (TES) is located in the United States at Edwards Air Force Base in California where test and evaluation of the F-35B Lighting II is undertaken.

Map of stations within the UK 
Map of the United Kingdom showing active RAF stations, Ministry of Defence (MOD) airfields (non-Royal Navy or Army Air Corps), MOD air weapons ranges and RAF stations occupied by the United States Visiting Forces (USVF).

See also
List of air stations of the Royal Navy
List of airfields of the Army Air Corps (United Kingdom)
List of airports in the United Kingdom and the British Crown Dependencies
List of British Army installations
List of United States Air Force installations

References

Citations

External links
Royal Air Force – List of RAF Stations

British airbases
UK
 
 
 
 
 
Stations